Anton Galkin (born 20 February 1979) is a Russian sprinter. He competed in the men's 400 metres at the 2004 Summer Olympics.

Records

See also
List of doping cases in athletics
List of 200 metres national champions (men)

References

External links
 

1979 births
Living people
Place of birth missing (living people)
Russian male sprinters
Olympic male sprinters
Olympic athletes of Russia
Athletes (track and field) at the 2004 Summer Olympics
World Athletics Championships athletes for Russia
Russian Athletics Championships winners
Russian sportspeople in doping cases
Doping cases in athletics